The American A-1 and A-101 were American two and three-seat biplanes of the 1920s.

Design and development
The American Eagle A-1 was designed in late 1925 as a training aircraft to replace the World War I biplanes then in use by the Porterfield Flying School. The prototype A-1 first flew at Richards Field in Kansas City Missouri on 9 April 1926. Small modifications made to the design in 1927, including ailerons on the lower wings, led to the A-101 designation. The 90 h.p. Curtiss OX-5 engine was initially fitted, but the 100 h.p. Curtiss OX-6 was fitted to later production A-101s.

Operational history
A total of approximately 300 A-1/A-101 aircraft had been completed by 1929. These served successfully with flying schools and private owners for many years and several survived in flying condition and displayed in museums in 2007.

Aircraft on display
Yanks Air Museum

Specifications (A-101)

See also

Aircraft of comparable role, configuration and era 
(Partial listing, only covers most numerous types)

Alexander Eaglerock
Brunner-Winkle Bird
Buhl-Verville CA-3 Airster
Command-Aire 3C3
Parks P-1
Pitcairn Mailwing
Spartan C3
Stearman C2 and C3
Swallow New Swallow
Travel Air 2000 and 4000
Waco 10

Related lists 

 List of aircraft
 List of civil aircraft

References

Citations

Bibliography

External links

1920s United States civil utility aircraft
Biplanes
Single-engined tractor aircraft
Aircraft first flown in 1926